Micah Aivazoff (born May 4, 1969) is a Canadian former professional ice hockey centre. He played 92 games in the National Hockey League with the Detroit Red Wings, Edmonton Oilers, and New York Islanders between 1993 and 1996. The rest of his career, which lasted from 1989 to 2002, was mainly spent in the minor leagues.

Playing career
His junior career was spent with the Victoria Cougars, in the Western Hockey League, and  he was selected in the sixth round of the 1988 NHL Entry Draft, 109th overall, by the Los Angeles Kings. He went on to play with the Detroit Red Wings, Edmonton Oilers, and New York Islanders of the NHL, as well as with various minor league and European teams.

Career statistics

Regular season and playoffs

Transactions 
February 5, 1988: Los Angeles Kings trades the rights to Aivazoff to the Pittsburgh Penguins in exchange for Brian Engblom
March 18, 1993: Signs with Detroit Red Wings
August 23, 1993: Signs with the New York Islanders
January 18, 1995: Pittsburgh Penguins claim Aivazoff off waivers from the Detroit Red Wings
January 18, 1995: Edmonton Oilers claim Aivazoff off waivers from the Pittsburgh Penguins
August 23, 1996: Signs with the New York Rangers

External links 
 

1969 births
Living people
Adirondack Red Wings players
Binghamton Rangers players
Canadian expatriate ice hockey players in the United States
Canadian ice hockey centres
Detroit Red Wings players
Edmonton Oilers players
ERC Ingolstadt players
Ice hockey people from British Columbia
Los Angeles Kings draft picks
New Haven Nighthawks players
New York Islanders players
People from Powell River, British Columbia
San Antonio Dragons players
Schwenninger Wild Wings players
Sidney Capitals players
Tampa Bay Lightning scouts
Utah Grizzlies (IHL) players
Victoria Cougars (WHL) players